The 1948 Soviet Cup was an association football cup competition of the Soviet Union. The whole competition was played in Moscow.

Competition schedule

First round
 [Sep 25]
 DINAMO Kiev                  2-1  Dinamo Yerevan              [aet] 
   [Pavel Vinkovatov 84, 112 – Akop Chalikyan 6] 
 [Sep 26] 
 Zenit Leningrad              0-0  Dinamo Kazan 
 [Sep 27] 
 DINAMO Leningrad             2-1  Krylya Sovetov Kuibyshev 
   [Anatoliy Viktorov 3, Vasiliy Lotkov 4 – Vasiliy Provornov 76] 
 TORPEDO Moskva               5-1  Torpedo Stalingrad 
   [Alexandr Ponomaryov 45, 68, 80, Georgiy Zharkov 75, Nikolai Morozov 85 – M.Bychkov 72 pen]

First round replays
 [Sep 27] 
 ZENIT Leningrad              4-1  Dinamo Kazan 
   [Friedrich Maryutin 8, 73, Ivan Komarov 51, Anatoliy Korotkov 83 – Klimov 51]

Second round
 [Sep 28] 
 Krylya Sovetov Moskva        0-1  LOKOMOTIV Kharkov 
   [Vitaliy Zub 40] 
 [Sep 29] 
 DINAMO Moskva                3-0  ODO Tashkent 
   [Vladimir Savdunin 9, 59, Konstantin Beskov 18] 
 [Sep 30] 
 CDKA Moskva                  3-0  Dinamo Minsk 
   [Vsevolod Bobrov 15, Vyacheslav Solovyov 28, Alexei Grinin 64] 
 [Oct 1] 
 TORPEDO Moskva               3-1  Zenit Leningrad 
   [Pyotr Petrov 55, Georgiy Zharkov 60, Antonin Sochnev 84 – Nikolai Smirnov 44] 
 [Oct 2] 
 DINAMO Kiev                  2-1  Dinamo Leningrad 
   [Anatoliy Gorokhov (DL) 6 og, Laver 35 – Vasiliy Lotkov 36] 
 SPARTAK Moskva               3-0  Dzerzhinets Chelyabinsk 
   [Alexei Paramonov 25, Ivan Konov 47 pen, Nikolai Dementyev 50] 
 [Oct 3] 
 Lokomotiv Moskva             0-1  DINAMO Tbilisi 
   [Georgiy Antadze 24] 
 VVS Moskva                   2-1  Metallurg Moskva 
   [Viktor Fyodorov 60, Gromov (M) 88 og – Konstantin Krizhevskiy (V) 47 og]

Quarterfinals
 [Oct 4] 
 DINAMO Moskva           7-1  Lokomotiv Kharkov 
   [Vasiliy Trofimov 21, 71, Sergei Solovyov 48, Vladimir Ilyin 55, 65, Alexandr Tereshkov 70, Konstantin Beskov 72 – Mikhail Labunskiy 29]
 [Oct 7] 
 SPARTAK Moskva          1-0  Dinamo Kiev 
   [Alexei Paramonov 55]
 [Oct 8] 
 VVS Moskva              1-2  DINAMO Tbilisi 
   [Vasiliy Volkov 13 – Viktor Panyukov 2, Nikolai Todria 33] 
 [Oct 12] 
 CDKA Moskva             3-1  Torpedo Moskva 
   [Valentin Nikolayev 16, Vladimir Dyomin 36, Vsevolod Bobrov 54 – Alexandr Ponomaryov 4]

Semifinals
 [Oct 15] 
 SPARTAK Moskva          1-0  Dinamo Tbilisi 
   [Ivan Konov 14 pen] 
 [Oct 17] 
 CDKA Moskva             0-0  Dinamo Moskva

Semifinals replays
 [Oct 18] 
 CDKA Moskva             1-0  Dinamo Moskva 
   [Vladimir Dyomin 40 pen]

Final

External links
 Complete calendar. helmsoccer.narod.ru
 1948 Soviet Cup. Footballfacts.ru
 1948 Soviet football season. RSSSF

Soviet Cup seasons
Cup
Soviet Cup
Soviet Cup